Lake Ubinskoye  is a freshwater lake located in the Baraba steppe in Novosibirsk Oblast, Russia, where it is divided between Ubinsky District in the west and Kargatsky District in the east. The name of the lake derives from Siberian Tatar ubu, meaning swamp or marsh.

Lake Ubinskoye is mainly fed by melting snow and usually has no outlet, but in the spring of some years it overflows into the Ubinke River, a tributary of the Om River.

Lake Ubinskoye is an oval-shaped lake with gently sloping banks. The lake bottom consists of clayey sand covered by a thick layer of gray fine-grained silt. There are several islands in the lake, the largest of which is called Medyakovsky. The western part of the Ubinskoye basin also contains a number of other small lakes.

Lake Ubinskoye freezes over from November to late May. The temperature is uniform throughout the water column due to good mixing. The water pH is between 7.6 and 9.0. Ubinskoye is a mesotrophic lake whose plankton is dominated by green and blue-green algae.

The shores of the lake are overgrown with reeds and sedges. In the mid-20th century Lake Ubinskoye was well known for its abundance of fish: bream (introduced in 1929), roach, pike, ide, carp, and peled were exploited commercially. Fish stocks crashed in the 1990s, likely due to the lowering of the water level; currently only small crucian carp remain. Attempts to restock the lake have failed, but a recent increase in water levels gives hope for future efforts. The lake and its surrounding wetlands continue to host a great variety of bird life.

Lake Ubinskoye is surrounded by several villages, the largest of which is Chernyy Mys on the north shore. According to legend, Kuchum, the last Khan of Sibir, flooded his treasure in the lake while fleeing from the Russians.

See also
Relict Lime Grove (Novosibirsk Oblast)

References

Lakes of Novosibirsk Oblast
Endorheic lakes of Asia